Hartvig may refer to:

Hartvig (given name)
Hartvig (surname)